Montage is a 2013 South Korean thriller film starring Uhm Jung-hwa, Kim Sang-kyung, and Song Young-chang. The movie was remade in India as Te3n in 2016, and in China as The Guilty Ones in 2019.

Plot
A kidnapper disappeared 15 years ago without a trace. Five days before the case's statute of limitations expires, someone is found anonymously leaving a flower at the crime scene. A few days later, another kidnapping takes place using the same method on a similar target. Police team up to solve the case before it's too late as in its previous case. Detective (Kim Sang-kyung) is consulted and he confirms it is a similar MO.

Later it turns out to be the child's grandfather (Song Young-chang), was the perpetrator of the first kidnapping 15 years ago. This was found out by the mother (Uhm Jung-hwa), and she kidnaps his granddaughter using the same MO. She thought the guilt will make him confess his past crimes. The detectives find out, confront the grandfather, and make a deal with him. He confesses his sins and goes to prison. Everyone involved in the long-unsolved case finds closure.

Cast
Uhm Jung-hwa as Ha-kyung 
Kim Sang-kyung as Cheong-ho
Song Young-chang as Han-chul
Jo Hee-bong as Detective Kang
Yoo Seung-mok as Chief detective Kwak
Lee Jun-hyeok as Chief detective Shin
Park Chul-min as Section chief Koo
Jung Hae-kyun as Detective Choi
Gi Ju-bong as Ear doctor Han
Oh Dae-hwan as Yong-sik
Kim Sung-kyung as Seo-jin, Ha-kyung's daughter
Heo Jung-eun as Bom, Han-chul's granddaughter
Song Min-ji as Bom's mother

Awards and nominations

References

External links
  
 
 
 

2013 films
2013 crime thriller films
South Korean mystery films
South Korean crime thriller films
South Korean films remade in other languages
Films about kidnapping
2010s South Korean films